In the Pit is a 2006 documentary by Juan Carlos Rulfo. The film won several awards, including the Jury's Prize for Best International Documentary at the Sundance Film Festival.  It tells the story of several construction workers in Mexico City involved in the construction of the second story of the Periferico Freeway.

Awards
 Karlovy Vary International Film Festival - Best Documentary
 Sundance Film Festival - Best International Documentary, Grand Jury Prize

External links
Official Website
 

2006 films
Mexican documentary films
2000s Spanish-language films
2006 documentary films
Documentary films about road transport
Sundance Film Festival award winners
Films shot in Mexico City
2000s Mexican films